Bilibili Gaming (BLG) is a professional esports organisation based in China. It was formed in December 2017, when Bilibili, Chinese video sharing website, acquired the I May League of Legends roster. The team expanded into Overwatch in March 2019 with the formation of an Overwatch Contenders academy team for the Hangzhou Spark, an Overwatch League team owned by Bilibili. Later that year, BLG's Overwatch team won the LanStory Cup 2019 Summer tournament.

League of Legends

History 
Bilibili entered the professional League of Legends scene on 17 December 2017 with their acquisition of LPL team I May. The team was rebranded as Bilibili Gaming.

Current roster

Overwatch

History 
On 12 March 2019, Bilibili announced that they would field an academy team in Overwatch Contenders China under the name Bilibili Gaming for their Overwatch League team Hangzhou Spark.

BLG's first season in Contenders China was 2019 Season 1, where the team posted a 4–1 record in the group stages. The team qualified for the regional playoffs, and in their first playoff matchup, they defeated the Shanghai Dragons' academy team Team CC. They then faced the Chengdu Hunters' academy team LGE.Huya in the semifinals; BLG lost by a score of 1–3. Following their first Contenders season, BLG competed in the LanStory Cup 2019 Summer, a tournament consisting of the top ten Chinese Overwatch teams. BLG placed second in the group stages with a 3–1 record to move on to the playoffs, where they defeated The One Winner in the semifinals and LGD Gaming in the finals to claim their first tournament championship.

Seasons overview 
Overwatch Contenders

Other tournaments
 LanStory Cup 2019 Summer – 1st

Current roster

References 

 

Bilibili
League of Legends Pro League teams
Overwatch League academy teams
Esports teams based in China
Esports teams established in 2017
Hangzhou Spark